Colin LaVie (born 28 October 1962) is a Canadian politician, who was elected to the Legislative Assembly of Prince Edward Island in the 2011 provincial election. He represents the district of Souris-Elmira as a member of the Prince Edward Island Progressive Conservative Party.

On 13 June 2019, he was elected Speaker of the Legislative Assembly of Prince Edward Island.

Electoral record

References

External links
 Colin LaVie

Living people
People from Souris, Prince Edward Island
Progressive Conservative Party of Prince Edward Island MLAs
21st-century Canadian politicians
Speakers of the Legislative Assembly of Prince Edward Island
1962 births